Alternaria zinniae is a fungal plant pathogen.

References

External links

zinniae
Fungal plant pathogens and diseases
Fungi described in 1972